The Fengcheng power station collapse occurred on 24 November 2016. At least 74 people died and at least two others were injured and trapped after a construction platform at a power plant in the Chinese city of Fengcheng in Jiangxi province collapsed. During the time, more than 60 people were working on the platform and another dozen were on the ground waiting to begin their shift at 7a.m. when the platform of a power plant’s cooling tower under construction collapsed.

See also

Willow Island disaster – a similar accident which killed 51 people in 1978 in West Virginia, US
List of structural failures and collapses

References

Building collapses in 2016
Construction accidents
November 2016 events in China
2016 disasters in China
History of Jiangxi
Electric power infrastructure in China
Building collapses in China